The third season of the One Piece anime series, subtitled Enter Chopper at the Winter Island on home video, was produced by Toei Animation, and directed by Konosuke Uda based on Eiichiro Oda's manga by the same name. The third season deals with the Straw Hat Pirates trying to find a doctor after Nami falls sick. They sail to Drum Island where they face off against the Wapol Pirates. There they meet Chopper who joins the crew.

The third season originally ran from August 26 through December 9, 2001, on Fuji TV and contained fifteen episodes. In North America and other territories, it was first licensed by 4Kids Entertainment and dubbed as part of a heavily edited localization. The total number of episodes was reduced due to some 4Kids episodes covering multiple Japanese ones. This version aired on August 27 though November 12, 2005, on the Fox Broadcasting Company and February 11 through February 18, 2006, on Cartoon Network, consisting of only twelve episodes. After 4Kids lost the license it was acquired by Funimation, who released the season on home video in 2009. This uncensored release contained a new English dub and the Japanese version with subtitles.

Three pieces of theme music are utilized by the season's episodes (one less than before): one opening theme and two ending themes. The opening theme is "Believe" by Folder5 in Japanese and Meredith McCoy in English. The 4Kids dub uses Russell Velasquez' "Pirate Rap V2" as opening for the whole season, except for the final episode, which uses his "Pirate Rap V3", and "Pirate Rap Instrumental" as ending theme.

Episode list

Home releases

Japanese

VHS

DVD

Blu-ray
The Eternal Log contains 16:9 versions of the episodes in standard definition Blu-ray format.

English

4Kids

Uncut

Notes

References

2001 Japanese television seasons
One Piece seasons
One Piece episodes